Brol may refer to:

 Bröl, a river in Germany
 Brol (album), an album by Belgian singer Angèle
 Jean Pierre Brol (born 1982), Guatemalan sport-shooter